Janet Williams may refer to:

Janet Williams (soprano), American soprano opera singer
Janet Williams (basketball) (born 1953), Australian basketball player
Janet B. W. Williams (born 1947), American social work scholar